KFF Kosova VR Prishtinë, commonly referred to as Kosova VR Prishtinë and colloquially known as Kosova VR is a women's football club based in Vranjevc, Pristina, Kosovo. It is the women's section of KF Kosova VR Prishtinë. The club play in the Kosovo Women's Football League, which is the top tier of football in the country.

Honours

References

Football clubs in Kosovo
Women's football clubs in Kosovo
Association football clubs established in 2002